Lion Babe is an American R&B duo from New York City, consisting of singer Jillian Hervey and record producer Lucas Goodman. Following their meeting through a mutual friend, the pair released the single "Treat Me Like Fire" in 2012, which raised their profile and led them to sign a record deal with Interscope Records. Following the signing, the duo released their self-titled debut EP in 2014, and their first studio album in 2016. Their second album was not released until 2019, on their own label.

Career

2012–2014: Career beginnings

Jillian Hervey, the daughter of actress Vanessa Williams and Ramon Hervey II, initially planned to pursue a career in dancing. Lucas Goodman began producing in his dorm room at Northeastern University before moving back to New York and interning at retro-minded Truth & Soul Records. During this time he found a vinyl version of  Eunice Collins' "At the Hotel 1974" and would go on to sample it for "Treat Me Like Fire." 
The pair met through a mutual friend at a party where Hervey heard Goodman's music, during this time she introduced herself to Goodman but the pair failed to stay connected, however did follow each other on the social networking website MySpace. Hervey then moved to New York for college, where she attended The New School. For a dance assignment, she then contacted Lucas for original music. This led to Hervey discussing her interest in singing and Goodman encouraged Hervey to try a soulful style of singing similar to that of Lauryn Hill and Erykah Badu.

The duo went on to name themselves "Lion Babe" which they described as taking on further meaning over time, the name stemmed from Lucas' horoscope sign a Leo and Hervey's hairstyle. 
The duo released "Treat Me Like Fire" in December 2012. During SXSW the following March, rapper Childish Gambino (Donald Glover) contacted Lion Babe and asked them to open for him. The duo subsequently acquired a US record deal with Interscope and a UK deal with Polydor that summer, and kept in touch with Glover who would go to guest on the lead single, "Jump Hi," from their self-titled debut extended play.

On November 18, 2014, "Treat Me Like Fire" surfaced among the new songs in Rockstar Games' PlayStation 4 and Xbox One releases of  Grand Theft Auto V's in-game radio station, Worldwide FM. On December 15, Lion Babe released their debut self-titled extended play digitally alongside the digital release the duo released vinyl and stream versions of the project with two extra songs. The EP was written and produced by Hervey and Goodman, under his production name "Astro Raw" and received positive reviews from music critics who described it as "a warm-blooded blend of soul, R&B and electronica" and noted similarities between Hervey and Erykah Badu. Rapper Childish Gambino was the only other artist who made an appearance on the EP, appearing on the song "Jump Hi' making the collaboration the trio's second. The song "Jump Hi" featuring Gambino would later go on to peak at number nine on Billboard's interactive chart Billboard Twitter Emerging Artists.

2015: Begin
The duo began work on their debut album, which was released in February 2016. Besides Goodman, the album features production input from Pharrell Williams and Dave Sitek, among others. Lion Babe announced that they would be producing their debut with friends and working with Mark Ronson, and that they had recorded another song with rapper Childish Gambino.
Hervey described the album's sound as being eclectic with influences of soul, dance, hip-hop and pop, and with "positive" lyrical content comprising messages of empowerment.

In 2015, Lion Babe released the song "Wonder Woman" which went on to peak at number one on Billboard's interactive chart Billboard Twitter Emerging Artists.
Lion Babe were featured on Disclosure's "Hourglass", from their studio album Caracal (2015), the single was released on 11 September 2015, as the third promotional from the album.

In October 2016, the duo was picked as Elvis Duran's Artist of the Month appearing on NBC's show Today with Hoda Kotb and Kathie Lee Gifford performing a cover of Tom Jones' "She's a Lady".

Artistry
Lucas Goodman is inspired by and studied the work of producers J Dilla, Flying Lotus and Timbaland. Speaking on his influences Goodman stated "Their techniques were like magic to me," during his production Goodman tries to bring funk and soul into a modern context, with the goal to create an iconic performance and a music brand similar to Prince and Iggy Pop. 
Goodman also takes production influence from rappers RZA and Kanye West, as well as Just Blaze. Throughout high school, Goodman began playing the guitar and cited Jimi Hendrix and Led Zeppelin as influences. Goodman also states that he is influenced by the city of New York describing it as a "melting pot" for "all sorts of other things".

Hervey states she is inspired by "classic vocalists" including Marvin Gaye, Al Green, Tina Turner, Chaka Khan as well as Erykah Badu.
Throughout their childhood the pair both grew up listening to artists such as Curtis Mayfield and Sly Stone, whilst Goodman stated that music that touched up on the early 2000s was as influence such as The Neptunes as well as The Strokes and the White Stripes. As a duo they stated that The Beatles are a huge influence on their musical style and also listen to various other artists from various genres including Lee Scratch Perry, Sergio Mendes in Brazil, and Fela Kuti. Both Hervey and Goodman stated they were inspired by singer and producer Pharrell Williams, stating they grew up listening to his music and his production.

Members
Current members
 Jillian Hervey –  vocals
 Lucas Goodman – production

Discography

Studio albums

Extended plays

Singles

As featured artist

References

External links
 

2012 establishments in New York City
American contemporary R&B musical groups
American musical duos
American soul musical groups
Contemporary R&B duos
Interscope Records artists
Musical groups established in 2012
Musical groups from New York City
Male–female musical duos